Paulo Sousa (born 31 October 1991) is a Portuguese singer-songwriter and YouTuber. He placed third in the sixth season of Ídolos, the Portuguese version of the U.S. TV series American Idol.

Nominations and awards

Discography

Studio albums

Singles

References

1992 births
Living people
Portuguese YouTubers
21st-century Portuguese male singers
Portuguese pop singers
Portuguese male singer-songwriters
Idols (franchise) participants